Turners Hill or Turner's Hill is the highest hill in the county of West Midlands, United Kingdom at  above sea level. The hill is in the Rowley Hills range, situated in Rowley Regis, near the boundary with Dudley.

The hill can be seen from many miles away, and offers good views to Clent Hills, Kinver Edge, Shatterford Hill, Barr Beacon and on a clear day to the Shropshire and Malvern Hills. There are good views of the hill from the M5 Motorway between Junctions 1 and 2.

Features
There are working quarries on the southern end of the hill that are used to obtain diabase.

On top of the hill are two large radio transmission towers which can be seen for many miles.

Dudley Golf Club is also situated on the hill.

Notes

Hills of the West Midlands (county)
Rowley Regis
Highest points of English counties